Lemeltonia monadelpha is a species of flowering plant in the genus Lemeltonia. This species is native to Trinidad and Tobago, Central America, and northern South America (Colombia, northern Brazil, the Guianas, Venezuela and Ecuador.

References

Tillandsioideae
Flora of Trinidad and Tobago
Flora of Central America
Flora of South America
Plants described in 1882